Sanhua Holding Group Co., Ltd. (三花控股集团有限公司) is a global manufacturer of controls and components for the HVAC & Refrigeration  home appliance, automotive air conditioning and thermal management industries.

Brief introduction
It is one of China's manufacturers and exporters of control parts and components for air conditioners, refrigeration, home appliance, automotive air conditioning and thermal management. It is one of the world's largest reversing valve manufacturers.
Customers include Carrier, Johnson Controls, Miele, Emerson, Heatcraft, Lennox, Manitowoc, Panasonic, Daikin, Mitsubishi Electric, Samsung, LG, Gree, Haier, GM, Valeo, DENSO, DELPHI and other manufacturers.

Company history
 Sanhua Holding Group was founded in 1984, in Zhejiang, as a refrigeration components manufacturer. Over the next 10 years the company added components for air conditioning valves, such as the Reversing Valve.
 After 2004 a Research  and Development Department was added, which works with Zhejiang University.
 In 2005 the company went public on the Shenzhen Stock Exchange under the code (002050:Shenzhen).
 In 2007 Sanhua acquired Ranco Valve division (Invensys), from then on, its reversing valve market share is more than 60%.
 In 2008 Sanhua intelligent (the public company) won China Quality Award, which marked the best product quality in manufacture industry.
 In 2012 Sanhua acquired Aweco (Home Appliances), and R- Squared Puckett Inc., in the field of microchannel heat exchangers.
 In 2016 Sanhua was invited to attend B20(one session of G20 Summit) as it is renowned in its sector. 
 In 2017 Sanhua built automotive tech center in N.America, and TXV line started in Mexico. At the same year, Sanhua Automotive won PACE Award for its Electronic Expansion Valve(EXV) which has satisfied many global carmakers' high expectations for balanced system performance and value.

References

External links
Official China Website
Official China group Website
Official Europe website
Official North American Website
Airconspares

Heating, ventilation, and air conditioning companies
Manufacturing companies of China
Chinese brands
Companies based in Zhejiang
Cooling technology
Heat pumps
Manufacturing companies established in 1984
Chinese companies established in 1984